The 2006 Golden League was the ninth edition of the IAAF's annual series of six athletics meets, held across Europe, with athletes having the chance to win the Golden League Jackpot of $1 million.

Programme

Results

Men

Women

External links
 Official site

Golden League
IAAF Golden League